Beverly Russell (December 9, 1934 – December 11, 2021) was a British American journalist and editor. She led the design magazines Interiors and Architecture.

Biography 
Beverly Anne Russell was born on December 9, 1934, in London to Leslie and Maude Russell. Her father was a department store executive. Her mother was a homemaker. She had a sister, Gillian.

Career
The Manchester Evening News was her first journalism position. After she moved to New York in 1967, she got a position with Condé Nast. There she worked at Brides and then House & Garden. She moved to San Miguel de Allende, Mexico, in the 1970s where she lived in an artistic expatriate community. In 1979, she was hired as the editor of Interiors magazine, a trade magazine for the interior design industry. Under her leadership, the magazine became business oriented and promoted women in the field. In 1991, she founded Beverly Russell Enterprises and was a business consultant. She officially retired in 2006.

Her 1992 book, Women of Design, was the first survey of female interior designers. The book also presents a history of design, including the predecessors of modern design when the term "interior decorator" was commonly used for the profession.

Personal life
She was married to journalist Roger Beardwood. Together they had a son, Benjamin. After the divorce of Beardwood, she married the photographer Jon Naar. That marriage also ended in divorce.

Russell died on December 11, 2021, through physician-assisted suicide in Albuquerque, New Mexico, following a terminal heart diagnosis.

Books
  (also Watson-Guptill Publications, 1983) 
 
  (first published 1997)

Articles

References

1934 births
2021 deaths
American women journalists
British emigrants to the United States
Journalists from London
American magazine editors